The 1954 French Grand Prix was a Formula One motor race held at Reims on 4 July 1954, the same date as the 1954 Football World Cup Final. It was race 4 of 9 in the 1954 World Championship of Drivers. The 61-lap race was won by Mercedes driver Juan Manuel Fangio after he started from pole position. His teammate Karl Kling finished second and Ferrari driver Robert Manzon came in third. This race was held the same day as the 1954 FIFA World Cup Final in Bern, Switzerland, but that event took place later in the day from this Grand Prix.

Race report 

The long-awaited Mercedes W196 with its straight-8 fuel-injection engine made its debut with Juan Manuel Fangio transferring from Maserati to join an otherwise all-German line-up of Hans Herrmann, Karl Kling and pre-war driver Hermann Lang. It was a dominant return with Fangio recording a practice lap of 124.31 mph. He and Kling led away and continued to race side by side around the Rheims track. The Ferrari drivers simply couldn't cope with the pace. José Froilán González retired after 12 laps and Mike Hawthorn's car blew up spectacularly. Former Ferrari double World Champion (1952 & 1953) Alberto Ascari drove a Maserati, as the Lancia D50 was not yet ready for racing, and lasted only 1 lap after starting on the outside of the front row. Herrmann set fastest lap before retiring, but Fangio and Kling continued their duel until the last lap when team orders were put in force and Fangio led Kling over the line by a mere 0.1 seconds-half a car length. Only six cars finished the gruelling race.

Classification

Qualifying

Race 

Notes
 – 1 point for fastest lap

Championship standings after the race 
Drivers' Championship standings

Note: Only the top five positions are included. Only the best 5 results counted towards the Championship.

References

French Grand Prix
French Grand Prix
1954 in French motorsport